Qareh Baba (also Romanized as Qareh Bābā; also known as Qarā Bābā) is a village in Ujan-e Sharqi Rural District of Tekmeh Dash District, Bostanabad County, East Azerbaijan province, Iran. At the 2006 census, its population was 2,472 in 530 households. The following census in 2011 counted 2,725 people in 770 households. The latest census in 2016 showed a population of 3,085 people in 929 households; it was the largest village in its rural district.

References 

Bostanabad County

Populated places in East Azerbaijan Province

Populated places in Bostanabad County